The blues is a vocal and instrumental form of music based on the use of the blue notes and a repetitive pattern. The word is also often used in musical contexts to refer to the twelve-bar blues, a particular blues song form, or talking blues, a form of country music.

Blues or The Blues may also refer to:

Art, entertainment, and media
 Blues dance, a style of social dance done to blues music
 The Blues (film series), a documentary series produced by Martin Scorsese

Fictional entities
 Blues, the final boss in the video game Yie Ar Kung-Fu
 Proto Man, a video game character from the Mega Man series, called Blues in Japan
 The Blues trio (Jim, Jay and Jake) from the Angry Birds game series

Music
 The Blues (song), 1990 song by Tony! Toni! Toné!
 Blues, a common "placeholder" genre for ID3 tags on MP3 files, and other formats
 "New Blues", a song by Joe Satriani from his album The Extremist

Albums
 Blues (Jimi Hendrix album), compilation album by guitarist Jimi Hendrix
 Blues (Bob Dylan album), a Bob Dylan compilation album
 Blues (Breakout album), studio album by Polish band Breakout
 Blues (Eric Clapton album), a 1999 blues rock album by Eric Clapton
 Blue's, a 1987 album by Zucchero Fornaciari
 Blue;s, a 2018 EP by Mamamoo
 The Blues (B. B. King album), a 1958 blues album by B.B. King
 The Blues, a 1960 blues album by John Lee Hooker
 The Blues (Alex Harvey album), a 1964 album by Alex Harvey
 The Blues (Johnny Hodges album) a 1955 jazz album by Johnny Hodges
 The Blues: Baby Please Don't Go 1935–1951, an album by Big Joe Williams, released in 2003
 The Blues (EP), a 2003 EP by Some Girls

Law enforcement and military
Dress blues (disambiguation), the dress uniforms of some law enforcement and military branches
 Jersey Blues, the nickname of the 1st New Jersey Regiment
 Jersey Blues, the nickname of the 50th Armored Division
 Royal Horse Guards, Household Cavalry regiment of the British Army, known as The Blues

Organizations
 Blues (Vénetoi), a political faction and associated chariot racing team in the Byzantine empire
 Bleus de Bretagne (Association of Breton Blues), a liberal and anticlerical organization in late 19th century Brittany

Sports
 Blue (university sport), an award won by athletes

"The Blues"
The Blues is a nickname of a number of sporting teams:
 Sturt Double Blues, Australian rules football team in the SANFL
 Carlton Football Club (nickname: the Blues), Australian rules football team in the AFL
 Cleveland Blues (disambiguation), various baseball teams of that name
 Nashville Blues, a minor league baseball team based in Nashville, Tennessee in 1887
 New South Wales cricket team, also known as the Blues
 Espoo Blues, ice hockey team of Espoo, Finland
 St. Louis Blues, professional NHL ice hockey team based in St. Louis, Missouri
 Blues (Super Rugby), rugby union team based in Auckland
 Cardiff Blues, rugby union team from Wales
 New South Wales rugby league team, also known as the Blues
 Buffalo Blues, a defunct Federal League baseball team
The Blues is a nickname of a number of association football clubs:
Italy national football team is nicknamed "Gli Azzurri", which translates to "The Blues" in Italian
 Waterford United F.C.
The Blues is a common nickname of a number of British association football clubs:
Birmingham City F.C.
 Bury Town F.C.
 Chelsea F.C.
 Everton F.C.
 Ipswich Town F.C.
 Manchester City F.C.
Southend United F.C.

Other uses
 BLUES, a German air pollution monitoring system
 Blues Saraceno (born 1971), guitarist and music producer
 Depression (mood), often referred to as "the blues"
 Butterflies referred to as "blues":
 Polyommatinae
 Glaucopsyche
 Plebejus
 Three narcotic medications sometimes referred to as "blues" due to their color:
 Alprazolam (Xanax)
 Diazepam (Valium)
 Oxycodone (Oxycontin/Roxicodone)

See also
 Blue (disambiguation)
 Les Bleus (disambiguation)
Hill Street Blues